Tallinna Kalev RFC is an Estonian rugby club in Tallinn.

History
The club was founded in 2006 as Tallinn Sharks RFC and changed their name to Tallinna Kalev RFC in 2013.

External links
RFC Kalev
RFC Kalev on Facebook

References 

Estonian rugby union teams
Sport in Tallinn
Rugby clubs established in 2006
2006 establishments in Estonia